Theodor Brinek (8 August 1898 – 25 July 1974) was an Austrian footballer. He played in one match for the Austria national football team in 1927.

References

External links
 

1898 births
1974 deaths
Austrian footballers
Austria international footballers
Place of birth missing
Association football midfielders
Austrian football managers
FC Wacker Innsbruck managers
FC Admira Wacker Mödling players
Wolfsberger AC managers